Shrewsbury Town Football Club is a professional association football club based in Shrewsbury, Shropshire, England. Shrewsbury's nickname is "The Shrews" which comes from the animal the shrew. The team competes in League One, the third tier of English football. The club plays its home games at the New Meadow, having moved from the Gay Meadow in 2007. They have won the Shropshire Senior Cup a record 67 times and are the only club from the county to ever play in the Football League.

Founded in 1886, the club were inaugural members of the Shropshire & District League in 1890 and then joined the Birmingham & District League five years later. Crowned champions in 1922–23, they switched to the Midland League in 1937 and won the Midland League title in 1937–38, 1945–46 and 1947–48. Shrewsbury were admitted into the Football League in 1950 and won promotion out of the Fourth Division at the end of the 1958–59 season. They were promoted again in 1974–75 after being relegated the previous year, and went on to win the Third Division title in 1978–79. They returned to the fourth tier following relegations in 1989 and 1992, where they won another league title in 1993–94. The club lost in the 1996 Football League Trophy final and dropped into non-League football after suffering relegations in 1997 and 2003.

Shrewsbury immediately regained their Football League status after winning the 2004 Conference play-off final. They subsequently lost League Two play-off finals in 2007 and 2009 before they won automatic promotion in 2011–12 and again in 2014–15 after relegation in the previous season. They finished as runners-up in the 2018 EFL Trophy final and 2018 League One play-off final.

History

Early history

The first club in the town was the Shrewsbury Football Club, founded in 1868, which in the 1877-78 football season won both the Birmingham Senior Cup and Shropshire Senior Cup, and was captained by John Hawley Edwards. It disbanded in around 1880.

The present Shrewsbury Town were formed in 1886, following the demise of first Shropshire Wanderers and later indirectly Castle Blues. The Blues were a rough team, leading to their demise after several games were marred by violence. The new team hoped to be as successful but without the notoriety. Press reports differ as to the date the new club was formed, The Eddowes Shropshire Journal of 26 May 1886 reported the birth of the club at The Lion Hotel, Wyle Cop, Shrewsbury. The Shrewsbury Chronicle reported the club being formed at the Turf Hotel, Claremont Hill, Shrewsbury. It may be both accounts are true, with a get-together at The Lion being finalised at the Turf.

After friendlies and regional cup competitions for the first few seasons, Shrewsbury were founder members of the Shropshire & District League in 1890–91, later admitted to the Birmingham & District League in 1895–96. Many of the teams Town faced in the early days have vanished, however Shrewsbury met many of today's Football League and Conference teams, including Crewe Alexandra, Coventry City, Stoke City, Kidderminster Harriers and Stafford Rangers.

In 1910, Shrewsbury looked to move to a new ground, having spent early years at locations across the town, notably at Copthorne Barracks west of the town. The club moved to Gay Meadow on the edge of the town centre, within sight of Shrewsbury Abbey, and stayed 97 years.

Shrewsbury's Birmingham League days were mostly mid-table, with a few seasons challenging near the top, the club being league champions in 1922–23.

A move to the Midland Champions League in 1937–38 saw the club enjoy one of its most successful seasons, winning a league and cup treble. Shrewsbury were league champions, scoring 111 goals . In addition, the Welsh Cup was won following a replay, the team enjoyed a run in the FA Cup, and won the Shropshire Senior Cup.

After a run of good seasons in post-war years, Shrewsbury were admitted, alongside Scunthorpe United to the old Division 3 (North) of the Football League in 1950, after being Midland League champions in 1949–50, following the decision to expand from 88 to 92 clubs.

Football League history
Elevation to the football league in 1950 saw the club play one season in the Northern section of the third division, followed by a further seven in the Southern section, this before they became founder members of the newly formed fourth division in 1958/59, gaining immediate promotion as runners-up to Mansfield Town at the first attempt. Shrewsbury gained their first promotion, to the Third Division, in 1958–59. They remained in the third tier 15 years, slipping back to Division Four at the end of 1973–74.

1960–61 season saw Shrewsbury Town reach the Semi Final of the League Cup. After beating Everton in the quarter-finals, they narrowly lost over two legs 4–3 on aggregate to Rotherham United. This era was also remembered for Arthur Rowley. He arrived from Leicester City in 1958, the club's first player/manager. During his playing and managerial career, he broke Dixie Dean's goal-scoring record, scoring his 380th league goal against Bradford City at Valley Parade on 29 April 1961. Retiring from playing in 1965 he remained manager until July 1968.

Shrewsbury were promoted to the Third Division in 1974–75 as runners-up, before another successful season in 1978–79, when they were league champions under Ritchie Barker and later Graham Turner.  Over 14,000 fans packed Gay Meadow on 17 May 1979 to see Shrewsbury seal promotion with a 4–1 win over Exeter City. In addition, the club had their first run to the FA Cup quarter-finals, before a replay defeat to Wolverhampton Wanderers. Turner is the team's most successful manager, winning the Third Division Championship in 1978–79 – his first season in charge – to take the club into the Second Division for the first time. They remained for ten years, although Turner departed for Aston Villa in 1984. Shrewsbury repeated their 1979 feat of reaching the quarter-final in 1981–82, defeating UEFA Cup holders Ipswich Town in the fifth round before defeat away to Leicester City.

The 1980s saw many big teams defeated by Shrewsbury, whose period in the old Second Division coincided with some of the current Premier League clubs. During the 1980s, Fulham, Newcastle United, Blackburn Rovers, West Ham United and Chelsea lost to Shrewsbury Town. Middlesbrough were defeated at Gay Meadow at the end of 1985–86, Shrewsbury winning 2–1, relegating Middlesbrough, who went out of business and almost out of existence.  The match was marred by violence from Middlesbrough fans, with many of them later having to return to Shrewsbury for court appearances.

In the early to mid-1980s the club enjoyed its most successful Football League run. Shrewsbury survived through the sale of players, with some to have played for Shrewsbury including Steve Ogrizovic, David Moyes, John McGinlay and Bernard McNally. They were relegated at the end of 1988–89 after ten years. In the Third Division, on 22 December 1990, Gary Shaw scored the quickest Town hat trick – 4 minutes and 32 seconds – against Bradford City at Valley Parade.  At the end of 1991–92, three years after relegation to the Third Division, the club was relegated to the Fourth – the first time since 1975.
However, two seasons later Shrewsbury won the new (fourth tier) Division Three championship under Fred Davies in 1993–94, and remained in Division Two (third tier) three seasons. Shrewsbury were not to rise any further, remaining mid-table before slipping down again at the end of 1996–97.

The 1990s saw Shrewsbury make their first appearance at Wembley as finalists in the 1995/96 Football League Trophy final. Shrewsbury lost 2–1 to Rotherham United; future Shrewsbury striker Nigel Jemson scoring both Rotherham goals. Despite promotion, a trip to Wembley and overall good results up until the disappointing 1996/97 season when relegation back to the basement division was tasted. Davies was sacked at the end of the season making way for former club captain Jake King to return to the club from where he began his career, following a successful reign at local rivals Telford United in May 1997.

Kevin Ratcliffe era and Conference

In the 1999–2000, Shrewsbury endured a poor season, with King failing to impress and in mid November 1999 was sacked as the club near relegation. Former Everton captain and Welsh international Kevin Ratcliffe fresh from four and a half seasons in charge of Chester City was appointed manager and saved them from relegation to the Conference on the final day of the season with a 2–1 victory away to Exeter City, the season known as the 'Great Escape'.

Town make steady progression and in the 2001/02 season they missed the playoffs thanks to a final day defeat at the hands of Luton Town. The next season saw Town hit the highs and lows, FA Cup victory over Everton and a LDV Northern final against Carlisle, but this was all over shadowed by a poor league form and relegation to the Conference.

Ratcliffe worked on improving the side. Former youth team and reserve player Luke Rodgers emerged as a regular goal-scorer, and with big names arriving at Shrewsbury, the team looked on the up, narrowly missing the 2001–02 league playoffs despite 70 points. The 2002–03 saw Shrewsbury enjoy an FA Cup run. After dispatching non-league sides Stafford Rangers and Barrow, they hit the headlines after Nigel Jemson struck twice to beat an Everton team featuring a young Wayne Rooney 2-1 at the Gay Meadow in round three of the FA Cup in front of 7,800.

Chelsea were the fourth round visitors, in a televised match on BBC's Match of the Day. Town lost 0–4, with Gianfranco Zola the man of the match. A near capacity crowd of 7,950 turned up for Chelsea, but from then on, the side's form disappeared, picking up just two wins in the league thereafter. Seven points adrift at the bottom and having conceded 92 goals, the club contemplated the end of their 53 years in the league. Following angry demonstrations from fans, Ratcliffe resigned, and Mark Atkins took temporary charge for the club final League game, a 2–1 defeat to Scunthorpe United, who were coincidentally the first League opponents for Shrewsbury Town back in 1950.

Northwich Victoria manager Jimmy Quinn was appointed Shrewsbury manager in May 2003, with the aim of getting them promoted back to the Football League at the first attempt. With most of the previous year's players released, Quinn assembled a whole new squad, with experienced non-league players such as Darren Tinson and Jake Sedgemore being joined by Colin Cramb, Scott Howie and former League Cup finalist Martin O'Connor. The league title went to Chester City, but with 74 points, Shrewsbury finished third in the league and defeated Barnet in the playoff semi-finals to set up a playoff final against Aldershot Town, at the neutral venue of the Britannia Stadium, home of Stoke City. The two teams played out a 1–1 draw which went to a penalty shootout. Shrewsbury goalkeeper Scott Howie saved three consecutive Aldershot penalties and defender Trevor Challis scored the winning penalty. Difficult times were just around the corner again which eventually culminated in relegation from the Football League in 2003, a painful 3-2 Gay Meadow defeat against Carlisle United sending the club down to the Football League.

Return to Football League

Quinn departed 14 league games into the season, being replaced by former Preston manager Gary Peters, who preserved Shrewsbury's Football League status in the 2004–05 League Two campaign. The club's time in the Conference proved shortlived as Shrewsbury bounced straight back up thanks to a penalty shootout victory over Aldershot in the play-off final at Stoke City's Britannia Stadium with goalkeeper Scott Howie the hero. Back in the Football League, the club took a little time to find their feet once again, although they did unearth two talented local lads in Joe Hart and Dave Edwards who would both go on to become experienced internationals. Shrewsbury's plans to move ground came to fruition, as chairman Roland Wycherley ceremoniously cut the first sod of soil at the New Meadow in the summer of 2006, moving it to the Greenhous Meadow on the southern edge of Shropshire's county town in 2007.

Despite the departure of a then talented young goalkeeper and future England number 1 Joe Hart to Manchester City, Shrewsbury went on a 14-match unbeaten run in the 2006–07 season; following a 2–2 draw against Grimsby Town in the final League match to be held at Gay Meadow, they finished in seventh place and thus qualified for the play-offs, where they defeated Milton Keynes Dons in the semi-finals. The team lost to Bristol Rovers in the League Two play-off final on 26 May 2007 at the new Wembley Stadium in front of a record crowd for any 4th tier game of 61,589.

The club moved to the New Meadow stadium for the 2007–08 season. Peters left the club on 3 March 2008 by mutual consent, replaced by Paul Simpson, who led the club to an eventual 18th-place finish in the league. After the season, the kit manufacturer Prostar earned the naming rights of the stadium.

The 2008–09 season saw Shrewsbury reach the play-offs again with victory over Dagenham and Redbridge on the final day of the season. They faced Bury in the playoff semi-finals, winning on penalties with goalkeeper Luke Daniels making two saves to send Shrewsbury through 4–3 on aggregate. Shrewsbury lost 0–1 to Gillingham in the play-off final at Wembley Stadium on 23 May in front of 53,706, with a goal in the 90th minute by Gillingham's Simeon Jackson. On 30 April 2010, after a disappointing 2009–10 season, Simpson was dismissed as manager with two games remaining.

Graham Turner returned to Shrewsbury Town as manager in June 2010. The club finished the 2010–11 season in 4th place, finishing with 79 points and qualifying for the playoffs, missing automatic promotion by only 1 point. They lost 2–0 on aggregate in the playoff semi-final to Torquay United. The following 2011–12 season they finished 2nd on 88 points. They won 1–0 over Dagenham & Redbridge from a James Collins header on the penultimate game of the season to achieve promotion to League One after a 15-year absence. Shrewsbury also enjoyed a notable run in the League Cup during the 2011-12 season, beating Derby County at Pride Park and top flight Swansea City before James Collins headed them in front at the Emirates, only for Arsenal to eventually run out 3-1 winners. Shrewsbury exceeded expectations the following 2012–13 season and ultimately managed to seal League One safety with two games to spare of their first season back finishing 16th, a 1–0 win at home to Oldham Athletic. The beat relegated Portsmouth 3–2 on the final day to finish 16th on 55 points. Completing the double over Coventry City and Preston North End among the highlights. The following season, a disappointing first half of the season saw Turner quit in January and relegation was confirmed after a 2–4 home defeat against Peterborough United.

In May 2014 ex-Fleetwood Town boss Micky Mellon was appointed manager. Town were promoted back to League One on 25 April 2015 with a 0–1 victory away to Cheltenham Town via Jean-Louis Akpa Akpro's goal. Mellon left for Tranmere Rovers in October 2016, and he was replaced by Grimsby Town manager Paul Hurst, with Shrewsbury bottom. In 2017–18, Hurst led Shrewsbury to the EFL Trophy Final, ultimately losing to Lincoln. He also led the team to the League One play-offs, but lost to Rotherham after extra time. Hurst left to join Ipswich Town on 30 May 2018. He was replaced by former Macclesfield boss John Askey, but he was sacked later that year in November having won just 5 of their opening 21 games. His successor, Sam Ricketts was appointed manager in December. A highlight of the 2019–20 season under Ricketts was a fourth round FA Cup tie against the holding European champions Liverpool which Shrewsbury drew 2–2. Town narrowly lost the replay 1–0 at Anfield in front of an attendance of 52,399. However, following disruption to the season in March 2020 due to COVID-19, final League One standings were decided on a points per game basis with Shrewsbury finishing in 15th place. In November 2020, Ricketts was sacked with Shrewsbury in 23rd place and was replaced by Steve Cotterill.

Stadiums

Racecourse Ground 
The Racecourse Ground was used in Monkmoor between 1886 and 1889. Town's first ground hosted 51 matches over 3 years. The majority of these were friendlies as Town were not members of any league. Their first game was a 5–2 victory over Wellington Town on 16 October 1886 at the Racecourse Ground.

Ambler's Field
Copthorne 1889–1893
Town spent 4 seasons at Ambler's Field, Copthorne between 1889 and 1893. Here they were founder members of the Shropshire and District League started in 1890. 22 February 1890 saw town's record victory which was 18–0 against Wellington Town (Bowdler 8, Phasey 3, Rowlands 2 Gosson 3 Aston and Murphy). Town played 44 times at this ground.

Sutton Lane
Sutton Farm 1893–1895
Town played 47 times in 2 seasons at Sutton Lane, Sutton Farm and when they moved from here, they also moved up to the Birmingham League. This ground is now allotments.

Barracks Ground
Town played at Barracks Ground, Copthorne for 15 years, over 300 matches between 1895 and 1910 against more classier opposition of reserve teams like Aston Villa and Wolves. In 1909–10 they reached the first round of the FA Cup.

Gay Meadow

Shrewsbury played at Gay Meadow, Abbey Foregate between 1910 and 2007. For many years, Shrewsbury coracle maker Fred Davies achieved some notability amongst football fans, by a unique service he and his coracle provided. He would sit in his coracle during Shrewsbury Town home matches, and retrieve any stray footballs that went into the River Severn. Although Davies died long ago, his legend is still associated with the club.

New Meadow

A new stadium was opened in July 2007 on Oteley Road, Meole Brace. It features a 9,875 all-seater capacity in four separate stands for football.

Capacity for concerts at the stadium is 17,000.

The ground has conference facilities, a function area, snack bars, licensed bars, a club shop and a restaurant. Within the stadium confines are training facilities for the club and a 5-a-side football complex which is run by Powerleague.

The first match at the stadium was 4–0 win against A-line Allstars featuring Gianfranco Zola on 14 July 2007. The first league match was a 1–0 win against Bradford City with Dave Hibbert scoring the winner. Shrewsbury's record victory at this ground is 7–0 against Gillingham on 13 September 2008 in League Two. The record attendance at the New Meadow is 10,210 vs. Chelsea in the 2014–15 Football League Cup. The record league attendance for the New Meadow was 9,510 for a League One tie against Wolverhampton Wanderers in September 2013.

The England under-19s and under-20s have both played at the stadium. The England Women's team have played three matches at the New Meadow. For sponsorship reasons, the stadium is currently named the Montgomery Waters Meadow since July 2017.

Club colours

The club's colours have always featured blue. However, blue has not always been the most dominant colour. Early kits included blue and white stripes, quartered shirts and all-blue shirts, which were worn with either white or amber trim until 1978. In 1978 Shrewsbury's most famous kit was introduced – the blue and amber stripes, which they wore as they were promoted in successive seasons, up to the old second division (now the Football League Championship). This was the design worn by character Derek Smalls in the movie This Is Spinal Tap.

The club was not loyal to the stripes for long, and in 1982 reverted to a blue shirt, then used a blue body with amber sleeves, later reverting to an amber body with blue sleeves. In 1987 the shirts radically changed to white shirts for four seasons before reverting to stripes in 1991–92. After a flamboyant abstract pattern on the shirts in 1992–93, Shrewsbury's kits have stayed mostly blue, with amber stripe(s) of some description evident since 1999.

The shirt sponsors have, since their introduction in 1982 until 2017, all been local companies. As of the 2017–18 season, the current shirt sponsor is The Energy Check, a South Shields-based Energy management company.

Club crest

The first crest to appear on the shirt of Shrewsbury Town was the town's coat of arms, The Loggerheads in 1907. The crest was used intermittently on shirts until 1960 through to 1970, when a generic football design was used. During this time, The Loggerheads continued to be used on other merchandise, such as match-day programmes. The Loggerheads returned in 1970, and in various guises continued to be used until 1986, when a "Shrew" cartoon was introduced as the club's crest in an attempt to rebrand "Salop" as "The Shrews". During this time, the club's kit was also changed to predominantly white. A campaign by fanzine "A Large Scotch" eventually led to the return of The Loggerheads crest in 1992. The crest changed once in again in 2007 to coincide with Salop's move to New Meadow, the new badge featured a single lion's head in a circle. The club stated that the new badge was necessary as any design incorporating The Loggerheads could not be copyrighted.

Supporters and rivalries
The club has many supporters groups from different areas of the nationally and internationally, including locally throughout Shropshire, Wales, Scotland, London and internationally in Italy(where there is a team called Shrewsbury Town in a league in Milan). Most recently there is a large supporters group in Portland, Oregon where there are ties with MLS side Portland Timbers. In 2019, a group named South Stand Flags was set up after the opening of New Meadow's safe standing section in order to "improve atmosphere at home games". The group, usually based in block 9 of the South Stand, organise choreography and flag displays. Their first fundraiser raised over £1000 which funded the purchase of 50 new flags. The group has gained a lot of praise from players and managers, including ex Shrewsbury boss Sam Ricketts.

An unofficial fanzine and forum named Blue & Amber was introduced in 2005.

In late 2019 the club started attracting fans from the small Caribbean island nation of Grenada. The support stemmed from the club having two Grenada internationals, Aaron Pierre and Omar Beckles, who helped the nation to a six-match unbeaten run in qualifying for the CONCACAF Gold Cup.  The president of the Grenada Football Association, Cheney Joseph, adopted The Shrews as his team, stating "I have fallen in love with Shrewsbury. I'm serious. I believe they can become a dream story, a Cinderella story". In November 2019, Joseph sent a partnership offer to the club, as well as a formal invitation for Town chairman Roland Wycherley to visit the country. On 9 November, Oliver Norburn became the third Town player to be called up by Grenada, whom he qualified for through his paternal grandfather. On 26 January 2020, Joseph made his first visit to his adopted club, where he witnessed The Shrews come back from 0–2 down to draw 2–2 with Premier League leaders and European and World champions Liverpool, setting up a replay at Anfield.

Rivals

The club maintains various fierce rivalries. The rivalry with near-neighbours Hereford United was ranked nineteenth in The Daily Telegraph'''s Twenty fiercest rivalries in English football in 2015. Known as the 'A49 derby' due to the road that connects Shrewsbury with Hereford, it has not been played since Hereford United went out of business and reformed as Hereford FC, who now play in the National League North, 3 divisions below The Shrews. This is similar to the rivalry with the now defunct Chester City. In 2010, a new club was formed named Chester FC who, like Hereford, also compete in the National League North and are yet to meet Shrewsbury in any competition.

The club also maintains a fierce cross-border rivalry with Wrexham, however, this fixture is now also very rarely competed due to Wrexham's relegation from the Football League in 2008.

The club's other main rivals include Walsall, Wolverhampton Wanderers, Port Vale and Shropshire rivals AFC Telford United.

Attendance records
The record for a Shrewsbury Town home fixture came on 26 April 1961 swelled by a large travelling contingent from Walsall, when 18,917 turned up in a Football League Third Division fixture.

The record attendance for a fixture at New Meadow currently known as Montgomery Waters Meadow, came on 28 October 2014 when 10,210 attended a Football League Cup 4th round tie vs Chelsea. The capacity was expanded from 9,875 to 10,360 with the introduction of temporary stands in two corners of the ground.

A list of the top ten attended fixtures in matches involving Shrewsbury Town.

Staff

Club officialsUpdated 15 February 2016Coaching staffAs of 4 December 2020Players
Current squadAs of 31 December 2022 

Out on loan

Notable former players

Record holders
Mickey Brown holds the club record for most league appearances 418, accumulated during three spells. However Colin Griffin holds the record number of total appearances with 497. Centre half turned centre forward Alf Wood scored 5 goals in the 7–1 victory against Blackburn Rovers in 1971 and became the first player since Dixie Dean to score four headed goals in one match.

Famous names

Several Shrewsbury players have gone onto, or came from prominent top-flight careers. These include current and former top-flight managers David Moyes, Nigel Pearson, Gordon Lee, David Pleat and Gary Megson. International stars John McGinlay, Jim Holton, Jimmy Quinn, Michael Gulla (American footballer), Jimmy McLoughlin, Mickey Thomas, Carl Robinson and Neville Southall all spent time at Shrewsbury. Doug Rougvie won the European Cup Winners' Cup with Aberdeen in 1983 and played for Shrewsbury later in the decade after a spell at Chelsea.

More recently, Premier League winner Mark Atkins spent later seasons of his career at Shrewsbury, as did Sheffield Wednesday's Nigel Jemson and former Nottingham Forest player Ian Woan. Coventry City stalwart Steve Ogrizovic was previously a Shrewsbury player. Two notable recent departees are local-born youth products, England goalkeeper Joe Hart and Wales midfielder David Edwards, both of whom have been capped at U21 and senior international levels. Edwards went on to play in the Premier League with Wolverhampton Wanderers and the Wales national team and returned to Shrewsbury in January 2019. Hart was a regular in the England senior team.

Local players
In addition to Hart and Edwards, Shrewsbury have given opportunities to many young local players, who have forged successful professional careers. Norman Hobson was a local Shrewsbury born defender in the mid to late 1950s and made 224 appearances. Bernard McNally was a local star in the 1980s, with two other local players, Kevin Seabury and Peter Wilding being fan favourites at the club in the 1990s. Veteran striker Andy Cooke was born and raised in Shrewsbury, and supported the club as a boy, but forged his career elsewhere after being rejected as a trainee. Tom Bradshaw is a recent Shrewsbury-born talent to have emerged from the Youth Team, and Mason Springthorpe signed for Everton prior to making an appearance for the Shrews, for £125,000.

Cult heroes
In 2004, the BBC's Football Focus'' ran polls to determine club's cult heroes, and Dean Spink was named as Shrewsbury's cult hero, ahead of Steve Anthrobus and Austin Berkley.

Managerial history

 Sir Trevor Brian Evans 1886–1905.
 Former olympian and local man, who took over the side from the "Castle Blues" and was the first manager of the club when they became Shrewsbury Town
 W. Adams (1905–1912)
 S. Wilcox (1912–1934)
 Jack Roscamp (1934–1935)
 Stan Ramsay (1935–1936)
 Ted Bousted (1936–1940)
 Leslie Knighton (1945–1949)
 Harry Chapman (1949–1950)
 Sammy Crooks (1950–1954)
 Walter Rowley (1955–1957)
 Harry Potts (1957–1958)
 Johnny Spuhler (1958)
 Arthur Rowley (1958–1968)
 Harry Gregg (1968–1972)
 Maurice Evans (1972–1974)
 Alan Durban (1974–1978)
 Richie Barker (1978)
 Graham Turner (1978–1984)
 Chic Bates (1984–1987)
 Ken Brown (1987)
 Ian McNeill (1987–1990)
 Asa Hartford (1990–1991)
 John Bond (1991–1993)
 Fred Davies (1993–1997)
 Jake King (1997–1999)
 Chic Bates (1999)
 Kevin Ratcliffe (1999–2003)
 Mark Atkins (2003)
 Jimmy Quinn (2003–2004)
 Chic Bates (2004)
 Gary Peters (2004–2008)
 Paul Simpson (2008–2010)
 Graham Turner (2010–2014)
 Michael Jackson (2014)
 Micky Mellon (2014–2016)
 Danny Coyne (2016)
 Paul Hurst (2016–2018)
 John Askey (2018) 
Sam Ricketts (2018–2020)
Steve Cotterill (2020–)

Club records
 Best FA Cup performance: Quarter-finalists, 1978–79, 1981–82
 Best League Cup performance: Semi-finalists, 1960–61
 Record Attendance at Gay Meadow: 18,917 Vs Walsall, Third Division, 26 April 1961
 Record Attendance at Greenhous Meadow: 10,210 vs. Chelsea, League Cup 4th round, 28 October 2014
 Record Attendance for a Shrewsbury Town match: 61,589 vs. Bristol Rovers (at Wembley Stadium), 2007 Football League Two play-off final, 26 May 2007.
 Record Victory: 21–0 vs. Mold Alyn Stars, Welsh FA Cup 1st round, 27 October 1894.
 Record League Victory: 12–1 Hereford City, Shropshire & District League, 20 October 1894.
 Record Defeat: 0–13 Small Heath, Birmingham League, 25 December 1895.
 Most league goals in a season  38: Arthur Rowley (1958–59)
 Most league goals in total  152: Arthur Rowley (1958–65)
 Most league appearances  418: Mickey Brown (1986–91, 1992–94, 1996–2001)
 Most appearances  497: Colin Griffin (1976–1988)

Honours

League 
Football League Third Division / EFL League One (3rd tier)
Champions (1): 1978–79
Play-off finalists (1): 2018
Third Division / Fourth Division / League Two (4th tier)
Champions (1): 1993–94
Runners-up (3): 1974–75, 2011–12, 2014–15
Promotion (1): 1958–59
Play-off finalists (2): 2007, 2009
Football Conference (5th tier)
Play-off winners (1): 2004

Cups 
Football League Trophy
Runners-up (2): 1995–96, 2017–18
Welsh Cup
Winners (6): 1890–91, 1937–38, 1976–77, 1978–79, 1983–84, 1984–85
Runners-up (3): 1930–31, 1947–48, 1979–80

Minor honours
Central League
Winners (2): 2009, 2013
Central League Cup
Winners (1): 2006
Midland League
Champions (3): 1937–38, 1945–46, 1947–48
Birmingham & District League
Champions (1): 1922–23
Runners-up (3): 1913–14, 1923–24, 1936–37
Shropshire and District League
Runners-up (1): 1890–91.
Mid Wales League
Winners (2): 1934–35, 1935–36.
Shropshire Senior Cup
Winners (67) - A Record
Herefordshire Senior Cup
Winners (3): 1951, 1986, 1998
Walsall Senior Cup
Winners (3): 1924. 1925, 1926
Shropshire Mayors Charity Cup
Winners (7): 1890, 1893, 1902, 1903, 1908, 1909, 1925
Keys Cup (2):
Winners 1924, 1937

source:

References

Bibliography

External links

 

 The Official Supporters Club
 Shrewsbury Town Supporters Trust
 Shrewsbury Town play-off record
 Shrewsbury Town Res. win Mid Wales League 
 Shrewsbury Town Supporters Club Scandinavian Branch

 
Football clubs in England
Sport in Shrewsbury
Football clubs in Shropshire
Association football clubs established in 1886
English Football League clubs
National League (English football) clubs
1886 establishments in England